P'yŏnggang County is a kun, or county, in Kangwŏn province, North Korea.  It borders Sep'o to the north, Ch'ŏrwŏn to the south, Ich'ŏn to the west, and Kimhwa to the east.

Physical features
A portion of the county is occupied by the Ryongam wetlands, which also cross into Ch'ŏrwŏn. Most of the county's terrain is mountainous, although there a few small expanses of level ground. The Kwangju  and Majŏllyŏng mountains pass through P'yŏnggang. The region is prone to heavy rains.

History
The P'yŏnggang area was known as Puyang hyŏn during the Koguryŏ period, and as Kangp'yŏng (강평) under Silla.  In the Koryŏ Dynasty, it was included in Tongju (동주); in the Chosŏn dynasty, it took its modern name.

Climate

Administrative divisions
On August 15, 1945, P'yŏnggang county included 1 ŭp(P'yŏnggang), 6 myŏn(Sŏ, Nam, Hyŏnnae, Mokchŏn, Sep'o, Yujin). Presently, it is divided into 1 ŭp and 30 ri (villages):

Economy
The county is well-suited to agriculture, and rice farming is especially developed. In addition, the mines of P'yŏnggang extract gold, tungsten, nepheline, zircon, alunite, and diatomaceous earth.

See also
Geography of North Korea
Administrative divisions of North Korea
Kangwon (North Korea)

References

External links

Counties of Kangwon Province (North Korea)